The discography of INXS, an Australian rock band, consists of 12 studio albums, 70 singles, 12 compilation albums, 4 live albums and 5 extended plays.

Albums

Studio albums

Live albums

Compilations

As featured on

Box sets

Extended plays

Singles

Notes
*  When "Never Tear Us Apart" was first released in 1988, it originally peaked at number 14 in Australia. After the airing of the 2014 miniseries INXS: Never Tear Us Apart, the single charted again in Australia and ended up surpassing its original peak, peaking at number 11.

Other appearances
Pretty in Pink: Original Motion Picture Soundtrack (1 song) (1986)
The Lost Boys: Original Motion Picture Soundtrack (2 songs) (1987)
Reckless Kelly Soundtrack (1 song, "Born to Be Wild") (1993)
 Beverly Hills Cop III: Original Motion Picture Soundtrack (1 song) (1994)
Donnie Darko: Original Motion Picture Soundtrack (1 song) (2001)

Video releases

Featured
In 2002 in America, McDonald's and Toyota used "New Sensation" for a promo campaign; the song was also featured in the 2003 film Shattered Glass. "What You Need" featured in a Chevy trucks advertising campaign. In Australia, "By My Side" was used by insurance company NRMA on and off for eight years. "The One Thing" is featured in Grand Theft Auto: Vice City Stories under the fictional radio station Flash FM.

See also
Music of Australia
Complete INXS Discography to 2001

References

External links
 
 
 Entries at 45cat.com

Discographies of Australian artists
Rock music group discographies
Alternative rock discographies
New wave discographies
Discography